Changi (also Romanized as Changī) is a village in Hesar-e Amir Rural District of the Central District of Pakdasht County, Tehran province, Iran. At the 2006 National Census, its population was 1,837 in 507 households. The following census in 2011 counted 2,018 people in 590 households. The latest census in 2016 showed a population of 2,015 people in 636 households; it was the largest village in its rural district.

References 

Pakdasht County

Populated places in Tehran Province

Populated places in Pakdasht County